Movement for Integration and Unification, was a radical nationalist political party in Kosovo, being a direct successor of National Movement for the Liberation of Kosovo,, a radical left-wing nationalist political movement in Kosovo, coming out as a faction of LPK in the 1990s promoting war against the Yugoslavian authorities and strong Albanian irredentism.

Its leader was Smajl Latifi, followed by Fadil Fazliu after his resignation. In May 2011, MIU joined the Movement for Unification, of Avni Klinaku, another former member of National Movement for the Liberation of Kosovo.

See also 
 Albanian Nationalism
 Albanians in Kosovo
 Kosovo War
 List of Kosovo Albanians
 List of political parties in Kosovo
 Movement for Unification
 National Movement for the Liberation of Kosovo
 People's Movement of Kosovo

References

Notes

Albanian nationalism in Kosovo
Albanian nationalist parties
Defunct political parties in Kosovo
Left-wing nationalist parties